National Route 209 is a national highway of Japan connecting Ōmuta, Fukuoka and Kurume, Fukuoka in Japan, with a total length of 35.5 km (22.06 mi).

References

National highways in Japan
Roads in Fukuoka Prefecture